Linum grandiflorum is a species of flax known by several common names, including flowering flax, red flax, scarlet flax, and crimson flax. It is native to Algeria, but it is known elsewhere in Northern Africa, Southern Europe and in several locations in North America as an introduced species. It is an annual herb producing an erect, branching stem lined with waxy, lance-shaped leaves 1 to 2 centimeters long. The inflorescence bears flowers on pedicels several centimeters long. The flower has 5 red petals each up to 3 centimeters long and stamens tipped with anthers bearing light blue pollen. It can on occasion be found as a casual well outside its normal established range; records from the British Isles, for example, are reasonably frequent (as per the latest BSBI atlas) but, grown as an annual, it rarely persists for more than one season.

Cultivation 
A popular garden plant, L. grandiflorum has been cultivated in a number of colours such as salmon.  Some varieties are known as L. grandiflorum rubrum, L. grandiflorum var. rubrum or L. grandiflorum 'Rubrum'. Other varieties include Bright Eyes.

References

Sources 
 Paghat's Garden: Scarlet Flax
 Murielle's Garden: Linum grandiflorum

External links
Jepson Manual Treatment
Photo gallery

grandiflorum
Flora of Algeria
Plants described in 1798